Jetson is an unincorporated community in Butler County, Kentucky, United States.

Geography and location

Education
Students in Reedyville attend Butler County Schools in Morgantown, including Butler County Middle and high schools. Since the early-2000s, the closest elementary school to the community is North Butler Elementary, located along KY 70 about halfway between Aberdeen and Jetson. Elementary students previously attended Fourth District Elementary School, which was based in Jetson. It, along with Fifth District Elementary in Welcome, consolidated to establish North Butler Elementary sometime in the early-2000s. The old Fourth District building has converted into a church.

Places of worship
Green Valley Church of Christ
Jetson Community Church
Temple Hill General Baptist Church

Post office
Jetson has a post office with ZIP code 42252.

References

Unincorporated communities in Butler County, Kentucky
Unincorporated communities in Kentucky